John M. Martinis (born 1958) is an American physicist and a professor of physics at the University of California, Santa Barbara. In 2014, the Google Quantum A.I. Lab announced that it had hired Martinis and his team to build a quantum computer using superconducting qubit.

Career 
John M. Martinis received his B.S. in physics in 1980 and his Ph.D. in physics from the University of California, Berkeley. During his Ph.D., he investigated the quantum behaviour of a macroscopic variable, the phase difference across a Josephson tunnel junction.

He joined the Commissariat à l'Energie Atomique in Saclay, France, for a first postdoc and then the Electromagnetic Technology division at NIST in Boulder, where he worked on superconducting quantum interference devices (SQUIDs) amplifiers. While at NIST he developed a technique of X-ray detection by using a superconducting transition-edge sensor microcalorimeter with electrothermal feedback.

Since 2002 he has been working with Josephson-Junction qubits with the aim of building the first quantum computer.

In 2004 he moved to the University of California Santa Barbara, where he held the Worster Chair in experimental physics until 2017. In 2014, Martinis' team was hired by Google to build the first useful quantum computer.

On October 23, 2019, Martinis and his team published a paper on Nature with title "Quantum supremacy using a programmable superconducting processor", where they presented how they achieved quantum supremacy (hereby disproving the extended Church–Turing thesis) for the first time using a 53-qubits quantum computer. In April 2020, Wired magazine announced that Martinis reportedly resigned from Google after being reassigned to an advisory role. On September 29, 2020, it was announced that Martinis had moved to Australia to join Silicon Quantum Computing, a start-up founded by Professor Michelle Simmons.

In 2021, he received the John Stewart Bell Prize for Research on Fundamental Issues in Quantum Mechanics and Their Applications.

References 

1958 births
Living people
University of California, Berkeley alumni
20th-century American physicists
21st-century American physicists
University of California, Santa Barbara faculty
Google employees
Fellows of the American Physical Society